Stewart Innes (born 20 May 1991) is a retired British rower.

Career
Innes took up rowing as a pupil at St Edward's School, Oxford and later competed for Durham University as an undergraduate, and for Reading University as a postgraduate.

He was part of the British team that topped the medal table at the 2015 World Rowing Championships at Lac d'Aiguebelette in France, where he won a bronze medal as part of the coxless four with Scott Durant, Alan Sinclair and Tom Ransley.

He competed in the men's coxless pair event, with Alan Sinclair, at the 2016 Summer Olympics.

After finishing 3rd at the 2019 GB Rowing Team Trials, Innes had been set to compete at the 2020 Summer Olympics in Tokyo but following the postponement of the games, he announced his retirement from international rowing in October 2020.

Personal life
His father Duncan Innes rowed and won a gold medal at the 1977 World Rowing Championships.

References

External links

 

1991 births
Living people
British male rowers
Olympic rowers of Great Britain
Rowers at the 2016 Summer Olympics
Place of birth missing (living people)
World Rowing Championships medalists for Great Britain
Alumni of the University of Reading
Durham University Boat Club rowers
Alumni of St Cuthbert's Society, Durham